Lord Heathfield, Baron Heathfield of Gibraltar, was a title in the Peerage of Great Britain. It was created on 6 July 1787 for General Sir George Augustus Eliott in recognition of his defence of Gibraltar during the Franco-Spanish Siege of 1779 to 1783. He was the tenth but eighth surviving son of Sir Gilbert Eliott, 3rd Baronet, of Stobs (see Eliott baronets). The title became extinct on the death of his only son, the childless second Baron, in 1813.

Barons Heathfield (1787)
George Augustus Eliott, 1st Baron Heathfield (1717–1790)
Francis Augustus Eliott, 2nd Baron Heathfield (1750–1813)

Coat of arms
Arms: Gules, on a bend or a baton azure on a chief of the last the fortress of Gibraltar winged with turrets between two pillars argent masoned sable, the gate of the castle of the last charged with a key of the second and below the same the words "Plus Ultra" ("more beyond"). 
Crest: A dexter arm holding a cutlass proper, the arm charged with a key.
Supporters: Dexter, a ram; sinister, a goat; each wreathed with flowers round the neck.
Motto: Fortiter et recte ("boldly and rightly")

References

Extinct baronies in the Peerage of Great Britain
History of Gibraltar
Noble titles created in 1787